Dito may refer to:

People
 Dito (footballer), Portuguese football player and manager
 Dito Godwin (1955-2021), American record producer
 Dito Montiel, American author, filmmaker, and musician
 Dito Shanidze (1937–2010), Soviet weightlifter
 Dito Tsintsadze (born 1957), Georgian film director and screenwriter

Other
 Dito CME Holdings Corporation
 Dito Telecommunity